Western dance may refer to:

 Western dance (Europe and North America), dance styles from the Western world
 Country–western dance, dance styles associated with the American West